007 is a code name of James Bond, a fictional character in the eponymous series James Bond.

007 may also refer to:

Arts, entertainment, and media

Characters
 Sir Great Britain (Cyborg 007), a character from the Cyborg 009 franchise
 George O'Malley or 007, a fictional character from Grey's Anatomy
Nomi or 007, a fictional character from the James Bond film No Time to Die

Literature
 ".007", a short story by Rudyard Kipling
Keishichō Tokuhanka 007, a Japanese manga series written and illustrated by Eiri Kaji

Music
 "007 Theme", a musical theme from the James Bond films written by John Barry
 007 (Wilber Pan album) (2009)
 "007 (Shanty Town)", a song by Desmond Dekker from 007 (Shanty Town)
 007: The Best of Desmond Dekker, a 2011 compilation album by Desmond Dekker
 Señor 007 a 1966 album by Ray Barretto
 "007", a song by Ray Barretto

Transportation
 BAR 007, a Formula One car
 Hycan 007, a 2020–present Chinese mid-size electric SUV
 Korean Air Lines Flight 007, a flight shot down in 1983 over Soviet airspace
 LOT Polish Airlines Flight 007, a flight that crashed in 1980, killing Polish singer Anna Jantar and the entire US amateur boxing team

Other uses
 Nong Samet Refugee Camp, or 007 Refugee Camp, a camp on the Thai-Cambodian border
 Microsoft Office 2007 or O07, but sometimes mistaken as 007

See also

O07 (disambiguation)
07 (disambiguation)
7 (disambiguation)